Lu Yen-hsun was the defending champion, and defended his title defeating Luca Vanni 6–7(7–9), 6–4, 6–4 in the final.

Seeds

  Lu Yen-hsun (champion)
  Blaž Kavčič (withdrew due to exhaustion)
  Go Soeda (quarterfinals)
  Yūichi Sugita (semifinals)
  Alexander Kudryavtsev (semifinals, retired)
  Marco Chiudinelli (quarterfinals)
  Thomas Fabbiano (quarterfinals)
  Denys Molchanov (quarterfinals)

Draw

Finals

Top half

Bottom half

References
 Main Draw
 Qualifying Draw

OEC Kaohsiung - Singles
2014 Singles
2014 in Taiwanese tennis